Nesiocolpodes is a genus of ground beetles in the family Carabidae. There are at least two described species in Nesiocolpodes.

Species
These two species belong to the genus Nesiocolpodes:
 Nesiocolpodes saphyrinus (Chaudoir, 1879)  (worldwide)
 Nesiocolpodes sloanei (Maindron, 1908)  (Indonesia and Papua New Guinea)

References

Platyninae